The 1996 Cork Junior A Hurling Championship was the 99th staging of the Cork Junior A Hurling Championship since its establishment by the Cork County Board.

Argideen Rangers won the championship following a 3–09 to 0–11 defeat of Fr. O'Neill's in the final. It remains their only championship title.

References

1996 in hurling
Cork Junior Hurling Championship